Sajjala Ramakrishna Reddy is the Advisor to the Government (Public Affairs), Government of Andhra Pradesh, India.

Early life
Born in Musal Reddy Palli, Simhadripuram Mandal  in Kadapa District in Andhra Pradesh State, to Late Sajjala Subba Reddy and Late Sajjala Parvathamma, Reddy completed his schooling at Pulivendula. The youngest of four children, Reddy has two brothers and a sister. His father was a Postmaster with India Post. Ramakrishna Reddy graduated with a Bachelor of Arts degree from Kadapa Government Arts College. He is married to Lakshmi Sajjala.

Career
Sajjala Ramakrishna Reddy (born on 16 June 1958) is an Indian politician and the current Advisor to the Government of Andhra Pradesh for public affairs. He is with the YSR Congress Party since its inception and held various positions in the party including that of the Political Secretary, General Secretary, and key political strategist.

Sajjala Ramakrishna Reddy, a former journalist, who worked as an editorial director of a media house known to follow the YSRC party line to the hilt, was appointed as the advisor of Govt. public affairs, and he also holds an additional charge of political secretary to the CM of Andhra Pradesh YS Jagan Mohan Reddy.

Ramakrishna Reddy started his career in 1978 as a Junior Sub-Editor at the Telugu daily Eenadu. He then moved to Andhra Bhoomi and worked as a Sub-Editor, later joining the then-newly established Udayam as the Chief Sub-Editor in 1985. He has also worked in various fields of advertisement, public relations, and pharmaceuticals. He is one of the founding editorial directors of Sakshi Media. He was the Editorial Director and the Publisher of the newspaper till 2014. After YS Rajasekhara Reddy's demise, when YS Jagan founded the YSRCP, Sajjala Ramakrishna Reddy was appointed as his Political advisor. As the Political Secretary of YSRCP, he has been a member of the Party's Political Bureau since its founding. The Party having come to power in the 2019 Andhra Pradesh Legislative Assembly election, Ramakrishna Reddy assumed office as the Advisor to the Government of Andhra Pradesh for Public Affairs. In this role, he advises the office of the Chief Minister, the Cabinet of Ministers, and the other executive and legislative functions in the Government. In July 2020, to strengthen the party institutionally YS Jagan Mohan Reddy allotted district-wise responsibilities to 3 senior leaders of the party, out of which Ramakrishna was given the responsibility of 3 districts Anantapuram, Kadapa, and Nellore districts.

References

External links
 
 

1958 births
Living people
People from Kadapa district
YSR Congress Party politicians
YSR Congress Party
Telugu politicians
Government of Andhra Pradesh